Seventh Heaven is the third studio album by the Japanese rock band Buck-Tick. It was released on vinyl, cassette and CD on June 21, 1988 through Victor Entertainment, and has been certified gold by the RIAJ for sales over 100,000 copies. The album was digitally remastered and re-released on September 19, 2002, with two bonus tracks. It was remastered and re-released again on September 5, 2007. The lyrics for "Physical Neurose" mention Gregor Samsa, the main character of Franz Kafka's The Metamorphosis. "...In Heaven...", "Oriental Love Story" and "Victims of Love" were later re-recorded for the group's compilation album Koroshi no Shirabe: This Is Not Greatest Hits (1992). Seventh Heaven peaked at number three on the Oricon charts, and 1st on the LP chart; it has sold 110,000 copies.

Track listing

Personnel
 Atsushi Sakurai - lead vocals
 Hisashi Imai - lead guitar, backing vocals
 Hidehiko Hoshino - rhythm guitar, acoustic guitar, backing vocals
 Yutaka Higuchi - bass
 Toll Yagami - drums

Additional performers
 Ken Morioka - keyboards

Production
 Buck-Tick - producers
 Yasuaki "V" Shindoh - engineer, mixing
 Ken Sakaguchi - graphic design, cover art
 Hisashi Imai - booklet design
 Kazuhiro Kitaoka - photography

References

Buck-Tick albums
Victor Entertainment albums
1988 albums
Japanese-language albums